A number of world records (WR) and Olympic records (OR) were set in various skating events at the 2022 Winter Olympics in Beijing, China.

Figure skating

The following new ISU best scores and Olympic records were set during this competition:

TES = Technical Element ScorePCS = Program Component Score

Short track speed skating

Speed skating

References

External links

2022 Winter Olympics
2022 Winter Olympics